Days of the Fallen Sun is the fourth EP by American art rock band Junius. It was released on February 18, 2014, through Prosthetic. The track "The Time Of Perfect Virtue" was originally recorded on the split EP Junius / Juarez, while the track "A Day Dark With Night" was originally recorded on the split EP Junius / Rosetta. The track "Forgiving The Cleansing Meteor" was made available for streaming on Pitchfork prior to the EPs release.

Critical reception

At Alternative Press, Tim Karan rated the album four out of five stars, writing that "Noticeably more similar to Catastrophist that 2011's more sonically diverse Reports From The Threshold Of Death, it's headphone music at its most majestic and macabre."

Track listing
Days of the Fallen Sun track listing. 
 "(Meditations)" – 0:40
 "The Time of Perfect Virtue" – 4:52
 "(Shamanic Rituals)" – 0:49
 "A Day Dark With Night" – 7:20
 "(The Purge)" – 0:36
 "Battle in the Sky" – 3:32
 "(Nothingness)" – 0:56
 "Forgiving the Cleansing Meteor" – 5:59

Vinyl digital download bonus tracks
 "A Universe Without Stars" (Living Phantoms Remix)
 "All Shall Float" (Zack Martin Remix)

Personnel
Days of the Fallen Sun album personnel adapted from CD liner notes.

Junius
Joseph E. Martinez – guitar, vocals, lyrics, synths
Michael Repasch-Nieves – guitar, album art design and layout
Joel Munguia – bass
Dana Filloon – drums

Additional personnel
 Justin Forrest Trujillo – additional percussion on "Forgiving the Cleansing Meteor"
Will Benoit – co-producer, mixing, mastering

Album artwork
Coven Illustación (Adrian Brouchy) – cover illustration
Matt Schwab – coloring
Matt Gauck – interior illustrations

References

2014 EPs
Junius (band) albums
Prosthetic Records albums
Post-metal albums